John Jacob "Jay" Berwanger (March 19, 1914 – June 26, 2002) was an American college football player and referee. In 1935, Berwanger was the first recipient of the Downtown Athletic Club Trophy, renamed the Heisman Trophy the following year. At its inception, the award was given to "the most valuable player east of the Mississippi."  In 1936, Berwanger became the first player drafted into the National Football League in its inaugural 1936 NFL Draft, although he did not play professionally due to a salary dispute.

College career
In a 1934 game against the Michigan Wolverines, Berwanger left his mark on Michigan center Gerald Ford in the form of a distinctive scar beneath the future U.S. president's left eye. In 1935, Berwanger became the first recipient of the Downtown Athletic Club Trophy, renamed the Heisman Trophy the following year. John Heisman was then the club's athletic director, and after Heisman's death in October 1936 the trophy was expanded to become a national honor and named the Heisman Trophy. Berwanger was a star halfback for the Chicago Maroons football team of the University of Chicago, where he was known as the "one man football team". He was also awarded the Chicago Tribune Silver Football as the most valuable player in the Big Ten Conference and earned unanimous All-America honors. Berwanger also competed in track and field for Chicago, setting a school decathlon record in 1936 that stood until 2007. In college, he was also a brother of the Psi Upsilon fraternity.

Heisman Season Highlights
During the 1935 campaign, when he won what was to become the Heisman Trophy. He rushed for 577 yards, passed for 405, returned kickoffs for 359, scored six touchdowns, and added five PATs for 41 points.  His team was 4–4 with a 2–3 mark in the Big Ten that season.

Heisman Voting
Berwanger received 84 votes, finishing ahead of Army's Monk Meyer, Notre Dame's William Shakespeare, and Princeton's Pepper Constable. He won 43% of the eligible votes cast.

After college
In 1936, Berwanger was the first player ever drafted into the National Football League in its inaugural 1936 NFL draft. The Philadelphia Eagles selected him, but did not think they would be able to meet his reported salary demands of $1,000 per game. They traded his negotiating rights to the Chicago Bears for tackle Art Buss.
Berwanger initially chose not to sign with the Bears in part to preserve his amateur status so that he could compete for a spot on the U.S. team for the 1936 Summer Olympics in the decathlon.

After he missed the Olympics cut, Berwanger and Bears' owner George Halas were unable to reach an agreement on salary; Berwanger was requesting $15,000 and Halas' final offer was $13,500. Instead, he took a job with a Chicago rubber company and also became a part-time coach at the University of Chicago. Berwanger later expressed regret that he did not accept Halas' offer.

Later life and honors
After graduating, Berwanger worked briefly as a sportswriter and later became a manufacturer of plastic car parts. He was very modest about the Heisman Trophy; unsure what to do with the trophy, he left it with his aunt Gussie, who used it as a doorstop. The trophy was later bequeathed to the University of Chicago Athletic Hall of Fame, where it is on display.  There is also a replica of the Heisman on display in the trophy case in the Nora Gymnasium at Dubuque Senior High School. He is a member of both the Iowa Sports Hall of Fame and  Chicagoland Sports Hall of Fame.

Berwanger died after a lengthy battle with lung cancer at his home in Oak Brook, Illinois, on June 26, 2002, at the age of 88. Berwanger was of German descent.

References

External links
 
 
 

1914 births
2002 deaths
American football halfbacks
Chicago Maroons football players
Philadelphia Eagles
All-American college football players
College Football Hall of Fame inductees
Heisman Trophy winners
National Football League first-overall draft picks
Sportspeople from Dubuque, Iowa
People from Oak Brook, Illinois
Players of American football from Iowa
American people of German descent
Deaths from lung cancer in Illinois
Psi Upsilon